The Vicious Breed (Swedish: Farlig frihet) is a 1954 Swedish crime drama film directed by Arne Ragneborn and featuring Ragneborn, Carl-Olof Alm, Sif Ruud and Inga Gill. It was shot at the Stocksund Studios in Stockholm.

Synopsis
A juvenile delinquent escapes from a detention centre and goes on a spree, committing a new series of crimes before he is eventually tracked down and cornered by the police.

Cast
 Arne Ragneborn as 	'Myggan' Strömholm
 Maj-Britt Lindholm as 	Laila
 Carl-Olof Alm as 'Bellman'
 Fritiof Billquist as 	Homosexual
 Sif Ruud as 	The Evil Lady
 Jan-Olof Rydqvist as 	Tjoffe
 Inga Gill as 	Mammie
 Lars Ekborg as 	Knutte
 Peter Lindgren as 	Inmate
 Lars Burman as Inmate
 Åke Grönberg as 	House Owner
 Sven-Axel Carlsson as 	Inmate 
 Bengt Martin as Tommy, Homosexual 
 Georg Skarstedt as Man Walking at the Beach 
 Catrin Westerlund as 	Ulla, Bellman's Friend

References

Bibliography 
 Qvist, Per Olov & von Bagh, Peter. Guide to the Cinema of Sweden and Finland. Greenwood Publishing Group, 2000.

External links 
 

1954 films
Swedish drama films
1954 drama films
1950s Swedish-language films
Films directed by Arne Ragneborn
Swedish black-and-white films
1950s Swedish films